The following is a list of feature films with fictional and factual lesbian characters. The films were released theatrically, direct-to-video, or on a streaming platform (non-television network).  Films are in alphabetical order by year of release.  Titles beginning with determiners "A", "An", and "The" are alphabetized by the first significant word.

20th century

1900–1959

1960–1969

1970–1979

1980–1989

1990–1999

21st century

2000–2004

2005–2009

2010–2014

2015–2019

2020

2021

2022

2023

Notes

See also

 List of film franchises with LGBT characters
 List of feature films with LGBT characters
 List of feature films with gay characters
 List of feature films with bisexual characters
 List of feature films with transgender characters
 List of made-for-television films with LGBT characters
 List of LGBT-related films
 List of LGBT-related films by year
 Films about intersex

References

Further reading

 
 
 
 
 
 

Lists of character lists
Lists of entertainment lists
Films With Lesbian Characters, List Of
LGBT Characters
 
feature